Stroitel is the name of several inhabited localities in Russia.

Urban localities
Stroitel, Belgorod Oblast, a town in Yakovlevsky District of Belgorod Oblast

Rural localities
Stroitel, Kaluga Oblast, a village in Tarussky District of Kaluga Oblast
Stroitel, Moscow Oblast, a settlement under the administrative jurisdiction of the Town of Mozhaysk in Mozhaysky District of Moscow Oblast
Stroitel, Novgorod Oblast, a village in Bykovskoye Settlement of Pestovsky District in Novgorod Oblast
Stroitel, Pskov Oblast, a village in Strugo-Krasnensky District of Pskov Oblast
Stroitel, Tambov Oblast, a settlement in Tsninsky Selsoviet of Tambovsky District in Tambov Oblast